MILF is a 2018 sex comedy film directed by Axelle Laffont (in her feature directorial debut) and starring Virginie Ledoyen, Marie-Josée Croze and Laffont. The film was released in France on 2 May 2018.

Premise
The film follows a trio of forty-something women who begin dating younger men while on vacation. The trio, Sonia, Cécile, and Elise, are friends who travel to the French Riviera to help Cécile prepare her vacation home to be sold.

During their vacation, they meet three men in their twenties – Julien, Paul, and Markus (a former family friend of Cécile's), who work at a local sailing club. The men are immediately interested in the women, who they have deemed "MILFs". The six of them spend a lot of time together as a summer fling; the film ends on their last day of vacation.

The film also features Laffont's real-life daughter, Mitty Hazanavicius, who plays her daughter Nina, visiting her for a couple of days.

Cast

Release 
MILF was released in France on 2 May 2018. It earned $417,231 from 249 theaters in its opening weekend, finishing 10th. The film went on to gross $961,745 in France and a combined $174,890 from Ukraine and Russia, for a worldwide gross of $1.1 million. The film was released on Netflix in the United States in July 2020.

Critical response 

References

External links
 
 

2018 comedy films
2010s female buddy films
2010s French films
2010s French-language films
2010s sex comedy films
Belgian sex comedy films
Films about vacationing
Films set on beaches
Films set on the French Riviera
Films shot in France
French female buddy films
French sex comedy films
French-language Belgian films
StudioCanal films